Al-'Amrah ( al-‘āmrah) is a Syrian village located in Al-Ziyarah Nahiyah in Al-Suqaylabiyah District, Hama. According to the Syria Central Bureau of Statistics (CBS), the village had a population of 575 in the 2004 census.

References 

Populated places in al-Suqaylabiyah District